The Nyons Bridge is a medieval bridge over the river Eygues in Nyons in southern France. 

The bridge was completed in 1407. It features a single span of 40.53 m, quite large for the standards of the day.

See also 
 List of bridges in France
 List of medieval bridges in France
Other very large medieval bridges
 Puente del Diablo (Martorell) (37.3 m span)
 Ponte della Maddalena (37.8 m span)
 Puente de San Martín (Toledo) (40 m span)
 Pont du Diable (Céret) (45.45 m span)
 Castelvecchio Bridge (48.7 m span)
 Pont Grand (Tournon-sur-Rhône) (49.2 m span)
 Pont de Vieille-Brioude (54.2 m span)
 Trezzo sull'Adda Bridge (72 m span)

External links 

 

Bridges in France
Arch bridges in France
Bridges completed in 1407
1407 establishments in Europe